Skjåk is a municipality in Innlandet county, Norway. It is located in the traditional district of Gudbrandsdal. The administrative centre of the municipality is the village of Bismo. Most of the municipal residents live in the Billingsdalen and Ottadalen valleys along the river Otta. The local newspaper is named Fjuken.

The  municipality is the 33rd largest by area out of the 356 municipalities in Norway. Skjåk is the 270th most populous municipality in Norway with a population of 2,151.

General information
The municipality of Skjåk was established on 1 January 1866 when the municipality of Lom was divided and the western part of the municipality (population: 2,691) became the new municipality of Skjåk (historically spelled Skiaker). The eastern part of the municipality (population: 3,299) remained as Lom.

Name
The municipality (originally the parish) is named after the old Skjåk farm, since the first Skjåk Church was built here. The first element is skeið which means "a running track for horse racing" and the last element is akr which means "field" or "acre".

Prior to 1889, the name was written "Skiaker", then from 1889 to 1910 it was spelled "Skiaaker", from 1911 to 1920 it was "Skjaak", and since 1921 it has been written in its present form, "Skjåk".

Coat of arms
The coat of arms was granted on 31 March 1989. It shows four white or silver-colored acanthus leaves on a blue background. This was picked to symbolize growth and strength. These symbols are found in many historic artifacts from around the area.

Churches
The Church of Norway has two parishes within the municipality of Skjåk. It is part of the Nord-Gudbrandsdal prosti (deanery) in the Diocese of Hamar.

Geography

Skjåk is the westernmost municipality in the Ottadalen valley. It is bordered to the north by the municipalities of Fjord, Rauma, and Lesja, in the east and southeast by Lom, in the south by Luster and in the west by Stryn and Stranda. The municipality lies along the Otta river between the mountainous areas of Breheim and Reinheim. Bismo is the modern population center and the location of the majority of industry and shopping as well as the municipal administration.

The community is at the meeting point between Gudbrandsdalen and the mountains between the eastern parts of Norway and the west coast. The municipality lies on a historically significant traffic artery between Stryn and Nordfjord, Geiranger, and Sunnmøre and the more easterly Ottadal municipalities of Lom and Vågå. The Breheimen National Park and Reinheimen National Park are both located in the municipality.

Of the total area,  is used for agriculture;  for forestry;  is covered by water (including the Breiddalsvatnet lake); and the rest is mountains and other non-arable land. Skjåk serves as a point of entry to the mountain areas just west; hunting and fishing are also popular tourist activities. The municipality includes a number of large lakes including Aursjoen, Breiddalsvatnet, Grønvatnet, Langvatnet, Rauddalsvatn, and Tordsvatnet. The Breheimen mountains run through the municipality and the Holåbreen and Tystigbreen glaciers are located in those mountains.

Climate
This gives Skjåk a subarctic climate (Köppen Dfc), thanks to low overall precipitation levels in summer.

In addition, one side of the valley, solsida ("the sunny side"), has a southern exposure, whereas baksida (the "back side") gets very little sun. Agriculture has been enabled by elaborate irrigation systems for hundreds of years, so the area is green and productive rather than desert-like.

History

Skjåk has historical roots back to the Viking Age and has a rich cultural heritage. An ancient route of travel between east and west went from Skjåk up through the Raudal valley and down through the Sunndal valley to Stryn on an arm of the Nordfjord. For example, in 1197, according to King Sverre's saga, Bishop Nikolaus is reported to have sent a group of baglers from Oppdal over the mountains to Stryn on Nordfjord, via Raudal.

Government
All municipalities in Norway, including Skjåk, are responsible for primary education (through 10th grade), outpatient health services, senior citizen services, unemployment and other social services, zoning, economic development, and municipal roads. The municipality is governed by a municipal council of elected representatives, which in turn elects a mayor.  The municipality falls under the Vestre Innlandet District Court and the Eidsivating Court of Appeal.

Municipal council
The municipal council  of Skjåk is made up of 17 representatives that are elected to four year terms. The party breakdown of the council is as follows:

Mayors
The mayors of Skjåk (incomplete list):

1960–1971: Trygve Bakke (Sp)
1972–1983: Hans Krogstad (Sp)
1984–1987: Åge Willy Rønningen (Ap)
1988–1995: Margit Grimstad Lien (Sp)
1996–2003: Hans Krogstad (Sp)
2003–2007: Ola Stensgård (Sp)
2007–2015: Rolv Kristen Øygard (Sp)
2015–2019: Elias Sperstad (Sp)
2019–present: Edel Kveen (Sp)

Notable residents
 Skjåk-Ola, (Norwegian Wiki) (1744 in Skjåk - 1803)  real name Ola Rasmussen Skjåk, wood carver
 Tore Ørjasæter (1886 in Skjåk – 1968) an educator, literature critic, author and poet
 Jan-Magnus Bruheim (1914 in Skjåk – 1988) a Norwegian poet and children's writer
 Magnhild Bruheim, (Norwegian Wiki) (born 1951 in Skjåk) author and journalist
 Rune Øygard (born 1959 in Skjåk) a former politician and convicted paedophile 
 Trond Bersu (born 1984 in Skjåk) a Norwegian drummer and producer

References

External links

Municipal fact sheet from Statistics Norway 

 
Municipalities of Innlandet
1866 establishments in Norway